Ryder Britton (born 21 December 1985) is a former Canadian film and television actor.

A graduate from Ivey Business School (MBA), University of Guelph (BSc), and George Brown Theatre School, his most prominent role to date was as Young Richard Hayden in the hit film Tommy Boy. He has also had appearances on the television series Degrassi: The Next Generation, Runaway, and Goosebumps. In 2010, Ryder was also a contestant on the Canadian reality television show Mantracker.

Drawn to acting by his mother, who was also an actress, Britton enrolled in acting school shortly after her death from breast cancer in 2000.

He currently resides in London, Ontario.

References

External links

1985 births
Living people
George Brown College alumni
University of Guelph alumni